The St Matthias Islands (also known as the Mussau islands) are a small archipelago group of islands in the Bismarck Archipelago, in northern Papua New Guinea. They are within New Ireland Province.

Geography
There are at least 10 islands. The largest and most northerly is Mussau.

To the southwest of Mussau are: Eloaua, Emananus, Boliu, Emussau, Ebanalu, Ekaleu, and a few smaller isles.
To the east of Mussau are: Emirau, and further east is Tench Island.

The islands have been designated as an Endemic Bird Area by Birdlife International.

Archipelagoes of Papua New Guinea
Bismarck Archipelago
New Ireland Province